Waldemar Gondek (born 3 October 1953) is a retired Polish runner who specialized in the 800 metres.

He won the 800 metres at the 1975 Summer Universiade. He also competed at the 1975 European Indoor Championships, but without reaching the final. He became Polish champion in the 800 metres in 1975.

References

1953 births
Living people
Polish male middle-distance runners
Universiade medalists in athletics (track and field)
Sportspeople from Szczecin
Universiade gold medalists for Poland
Medalists at the 1975 Summer Universiadel